Cnoc na Péiste (Irish for "hill of the serpent"), anglicised Knocknapeasta, at , is the fourth-highest peak in Ireland, on the Arderin and Vandeleur-Lynam lists. Cnoc na Péiste is part of the MacGillycuddy's Reeks range in County Kerry. It is one of only two 3,000 ft peaks in the Reeks with a prominence above the Marilyn threshold of 150 metres, and is the highest summit of the Eastern Reeks.  In 1943, a USAAF plane crashed into the mountain, killing all five crew, and parts of the wreckage can still be seen in Lough Cummeenapeasta.

Geography

Cnoc na Péiste is the highest point in the Eastern Reeks section of the MacGillycuddy's Reeks range, which consists of a long narrow ridge that takes in several summits before ending at Cruach Mhór  and descending into the Gap of Dunloe, to the Head of the Gap, only to rise up again towards the Purple Mountain Group. 

To the southwest of Cnoc na Péiste is the peak of Maolán Buí and a generally flat grassy ridge to the col at the Devil's Ladder.  To the northeast is the narrow sharp rocky arête that joins with The Big Gun, and Cruach Mhór, which marks the end of the eastern ridge of the Reeks.

Between Cnoc na Péiste and The Big Gun are two small lakes—Loch Coimín Piast (anglicised Lough Cummeenapeasta) and Lough Googh — one on either side of the ridge. A stream called Glasheencummeennapeasta flows northwards from Lough Cummeenapeasta into Hag's Glen, to join the Gaddagh River. On the other side of the ridge, a stream flows southwards from Lough Googh into the Derrycarna River.

Because of its positioning, Cnoc na Péiste is usually climbed as part of a horseshoe of the eastern section of the Reeks, starting from the Hag's Glen, and taking in Maolan Bui and The Big Gun, or as part of the even longer MacGillycuddy's Reeks Ridge Walk.

It is the 231st-highest mountain in Britain and Ireland on the Simm classification. Cnoc na Péiste is regarded by the Scottish Mountaineering Club ("SMC") as one of 34 Furths, which is a mountain above  in elevation, and meets the other SMC criteria for a Munro (e.g. "sufficient separation"), but which is outside of (or furth) Scotland; which is why Knocknapeasta is sometimes referred to as one of the 13 Irish Munros.    

Cnoc na Péiste's prominence qualifies it to meet the British Isles Marilyn classification, being the only other 3,000 foot Reek alongside Carrauntoohil to meet the 150 metre Marilyn prominence threshold. Cnoc na Péiste also meets the Arderin, Simm and Hewitt classifications. Knocknapeasta ranks as the second-highest mountain in Ireland on the MountainViews Online Database, 100 Highest Irish Mountains, where the prominence threshold is over 100 metres.

Aircraft crash
At about 7 am on 17 December 1943, during World War II, a United States Army Air Forces (USAAF) plane crashed into the northerly face of Cnoc na Péiste. The plane was a Douglas C-47 or Dakota (serial number 43-30719) with five crewmen aboard. It struck the mountain just above Lough Cummeenapeasta at an altitude of about 2,000 ft—killing all five passengers. The Gardaí were not alerted to the crash until 3 February 1944, and the following day an Irish Army detachment was sent to recover the bodies. Pieces of the aircraft can still be seen on the mountainside, and in the lake below (a rope is tied to a piece of the wreckage in the water). A plaque was placed at the shore of the lake to commemorate the victims.

See also 

 Lists of mountains in Ireland
 List of mountains of the British Isles by height
 List of Furth mountains in the British Isles
 List of Marilyns in the British Isles

References

External links
MountainViews: The Irish Mountain Website, Knocknapeasta 
MountainViews: Irish Online Mountain Database
The Database of British and Irish Hills , the largest database of British Isles mountains ("DoBIH")
Hill Bagging UK & Ireland, the searchable interface for the DoBIH
Ordnance Survey Ireland ("OSI") Online Map Viewer
Logainm: Placenames Database of Ireland

Marilyns of Ireland
Hewitts of Ireland
Mountains and hills of County Kerry
Furths
Mountains under 1000 metres
Aviation accidents and incidents in Ireland